The PR3 mixed double sculls competition at the 2019 World Rowing Championships took place at the Linz-Ottensheim regatta venue.

Schedule
The schedule was as follows:

All times are Central European Summer Time (UTC+2)

Results

Test race
With fewer than seven entries in this event, boats contested a race for lanes before the final.

Final
The final determined the rankings.

References

2019 World Rowing Championships